The Appling County School District is a public school district in Appling County, Georgia, United States, based in Baxley. It serves the communities of Baxley, Graham, and Surrency.

Schools
The Appling County School District has four elementary schools, one middle school, and one high school.

Elementary schools
 Altamaha Elementary School
 Appling County Primary School
 Appling County Elementary School
 Fourth District Elementary School

Middle school
 Appling County Middle School

High school
 Appling County High School

References

External links
 

School districts in Georgia (U.S. state)
Education in Appling County, Georgia